Greenpeace or Greenpeace International is a non-governmental environmental organization founded in Vancouver in 1971.

Greenpeace may also refer to:
 Greenpeace USA, an affiliate of Greenpeace International
 Greenpeace Foundation, a USA based environmental organization founded in Honolulu in 1976, not affiliated to Greenpeace International
 London Greenpeace, an anarchist environmentalist activist collective that existed between 1971 and 2001, not affiliated to Greenpeace International
 MV Greenpeace, another ship used by Greenpeace International
 Greenpeace Energy, German energy company affiliated to Greenpeace International 
 Greenpeace Magazin, environmental magazine in Germany
 Greenpeace (music group), 2005 New Zealand charity supergroup affiliated to Greenpeace International 
 Phyllis Cormack, the first ship used under the name Greenpeace by the organisation that later became Greenpeace International
 The Green Peace Laboratory was the metallurgist Henry Marion Howe's laboratory in retirement (1913-1922)